Didawata is a patwar circle and village in ILRC Madhorajpura in Phagi tehsil in Jaipur district, Rajasthan. Didawata is also a patwar circle for nearby villages, Bhanpura, Mukand Pura, Sangrampura, Hanootiya Kalan and Hanootiya Khurd.

In Didawata, there are 342 households with total population of 2,172 (with 53.59% males and 46.41% females), based on 2011 census. Total area of village is 16.95 km2.

References

Cities and towns in Jaipur district